American rock band The Pretty Reckless has released four studio albums, two extended plays, 13 singles, four promotional singles, and 14 music videos. Originally named The Reckless, the band was formed in early 2009, with Taylor Momsen on vocals, Ben Phillips on lead guitar, Mark Damon on bass and Jamie Perkins on drums.

During 2009, they played some small concerts in New York City and then opened for The Veronicas on their North American tour. Following the end of that tour, Interscope Records signed a record deal with the band. Their debut single, "Make Me Wanna Die", reached the top 20 of the UK Singles Chart. The song was eventually featured on their debut studio album, Light Me Up, released in August 2010. The album had sold over one million units in combined singles and albums sales as of January 2014. In March 2012, the band released their second extended play, Hit Me Like a Man EP, which included three original tracks.

In 2013, The Pretty Reckless signed with label Razor & Tie to release their second studio album, Going to Hell, in March 2014. The album peaked at number five on the Billboard 200, spawned five singles, of which three topped Billboards Mainstream Rock chart—"Heaven Knows", "Messed Up World (F'd Up World)", and "Follow Me Down". In October 2016, the band released a follow-up album, Who You Selling For, which peaked at number 13 on the Billboard 200. Its lead single, "Take Me Down", topped the US Mainstream Rock chart, making The Pretty Reckless the first act to send its first four entries to number one on that chart, as well as the female-fronted group with the most number ones. Their fourth album Death by Rock and Roll was released in February 2021, through Fearless Records, and its title track and lead single became their fifth US Mainstream Rock number one. The song also gave the band their first number one on Billboard Canada Rock chart. The follow-up singles, "And So It Went" and "Only Love Can Save Me Now", extended their record for the most number ones for any woman-led act in Billboard's Mainstream Rock chart's history and marked the second time the band topped the chart with three different tracks from the same album.

Albums

Studio albums

Compilation albums

Extended plays

Singles

Promotional singles

Guest appearances

Music videos

Notes

References

External links
 
 
 
 

Alternative rock discographies
Discographies of American artists
Rock music group discographies